Nils-Erik Jonsson is a Swedish sprint canoer who competed in the late 1990s. He won a bronze medal in the K-4 500 m event at the 1997 ICF Canoe Sprint World Championships in Dartmouth.

References

Living people
Swedish male canoeists
Year of birth missing (living people)
ICF Canoe Sprint World Championships medalists in kayak